KASP may refer to:

 KASP-LP, a radio station (107.9 FM) licensed to Aspen, Colorado, United States
 King Abdullah Science Park
 Kompetitive allele specific PCR, a DNA profiling technique
 Krašto apsaugos savanorių pajėgos (KASP), Lithuanian National Defence Volunteer Forces